Hatun K'irawniyuq (Quechua hatun big, k'iraw cradle, bed of a child, -ni, -yuq suffixes, "the one with a big cradle" or "the big one with a cradle", Hispanicized spelling Jatun Quirauniyoc) is a mountain in the Arequipa Region in the Andes of Peru, about  high. It is situated in the Condesuyos Province, Salamanca District, north of the volcano Coropuna. The peak west of K'irawniyuq is named Quri Qhawana (Ccorecahuana). One of the nearest populated places is Mawk'allaqta (Quechua for "old town", Maucallacta) in the northeast. The village is situated at the mountain Mawk'a Llaqta (Mauca Llacta).

References 

Mountains of Peru
Mountains of Arequipa Region